Enterprise Magazine was a Canadian bimonthly business magazine that was in circulation between 1998 and April 2020.

History and profile
It was launched in 1998 as Small Business Canada Magazine. The name change to Enterprise was made in January 2005 as its readership grew to include small and medium-sized enterprises (SMEs) across Canada.

Based in Barrie, Ontario, Enterprise was published four times a year. Its frequency switched to bimonthly later. It was first owned by Typgrafika Inc of Barrie, Ontario. The publisher was Hayden R. Bradshaw. As of 2015 it was published by Central 1. The magazine ceased publication after the March/April 2020 issue due to low readership.

References

External links
Official website

1998 establishments in Ontario
2020 disestablishments in Ontario
Bi-monthly magazines published in Canada
Business magazines published in Canada
Defunct magazines published in Canada
Magazines established in 1998
Magazines disestablished in 2020
Magazines published in Ontario
Mass media in Barrie
Organizations related to small and medium-sized enterprises
Quarterly magazines published in Canada